Jarryd Christopher Sage (born ) is a Welsh-qualified South African rugby union player, currently playing with Welsh Pro14 side the Dragons. His regular position is centre. Sage qualifies for Wales through his father, who was born in Newbridge within the Dragons' region.

Rugby career

Youth Rugby / Western Province

Sage was born in Cape Town, where he attended Wynberg Boys' High School. He earned provincial colours at school level, representing Western Province at the Under-18 Craven Week competition in 2013.

He represented the  team in the Under-19 Provincial Championship in the same year, as returned in 2014 as a member of the Western Province Rugby Institute.

He was included in the  squad for the 2015 Varsity Cup, and the Western Province squad for the 2015 Vodacom Cup, but didn't feature in either competition. In the latter half of the year, he played for the  team in the Under-21 Provincial Championship, scoring a try for the team in their match against  en route to finishing top of the log, and eventually winning the title, beating  52–17 in the final.

Golden Lions

Southern Kings / Eastern Province Kings

In August 2017, Sage moved to Port Elizabeth to join a  team about to embark on their first Pro14 campaign.

Dragons

In November 2017, Welsh side Dragons announced that Sage would make the move to Newport to join the team.

External links
Dragons profile

Personal life

Sage is the grandson of Doug Hopwood, a rugby player that represented the South Africa national rugby union team in 22 test matches between 1961 and 1965. His older brother Dylan is also a professional rugby union player, representing the South Africa Sevens team since 2015.

References

South African rugby union players
Living people
1995 births
Rugby union players from Cape Town
Rugby union centres
Eastern Province Elephants players
Golden Lions players
Southern Kings players
Dragons RFC players